The Chief Secretary is the chief administrative officer and senior–most civil servant of the Government of Nepal. The chief secretary is the head of the Cabinet Secretariat and is the secretary of the cabinet and the constitutional council. The Cabinet Secretary enforces cabinet discipline and coordinates between ministries.
Current Chief secretary of Nepal is (Shanker Das Bairagi).

List of Chief Secretaries

See also 
 Government of Nepal

References 

 Government of Nepal